Brigadier Gerard is the hero of a series of 17 historical short stories, a play, and a major character in a novel by the British writer Arthur Conan Doyle. Brigadier Etienne Gerard is a Hussar officer in the French Army during the Napoleonic Wars. Gerard's most notable attribute is his vanity – he is utterly convinced that he is the bravest soldier, greatest swordsman, most accomplished horseman and most gallant lover in all France. Gerard is not entirely wrong, since he displays notable bravery on many occasions, but his self-satisfaction undercuts this quite often. Obsessed with honour and glory, he is always ready with a stirring speech or a gallant remark to a lady.

Doyle, in making his hero a vain, and often rather uncomprehending, Frenchman, was able to satirise both the stereotypical English view of the French and – by presenting them from Gerard's baffled point of view – English manners and attitudes.

Biography
Gerard tells the stories from the point of view of an old man now living in retirement in Paris. We discover that he was born in Gascony in the early 1780s (he is 25 in "How the Brigadier Captured Saragossa"). In "How the Brigadier Rode to Minsk" he attends a review of troops about to depart for the Crimea (1854–5), and this is the last identifiable date in his life, although "The Last Adventure of the Brigadier" has a still later setting, with Gerard about to return to his Gascon homeland. He first joins the 2nd Hussars – the Hussars of Chamborant (now the Second Hussars based in Haguenau, Alsace) – around 1799, serving as a lieutenant and junior captain. He first sees action at Marengo in Italy in 1800. He transfers to the 3rd Hussars of Conflans in 1807 as a senior captain. He speaks somewhat idiosyncratic English, having learned it from an officer of the Irish Brigade of the French Army. By 1810 he is colonel of the 2nd Hussars. He serves in Spain, Portugal, Italy, Germany and Russia. He is awarded the Grand-Cross of the Légion d'honneur by Napoleon in 1814. There are various discrepancies in the accounts of his life, not the least that in none of the stories except the last is he married.

Conan Doyle modelled the character of Gerard on a number of real-life sources from the Napoleonic era, writing in his author's preface that "readers of Marbot, de Gonneville, Coignet, de Fenezac, Bourgogne (fr), and the other French soldiers who have recorded their reminiscences of the Napoleonic campaigns will recognise the fountain from which I have drawn the adventures of Etienne Gerard." Conan Doyle enthusiasts have noted that although Gerard is a fictional character, he may have been inspired in particular by the real-life Baron Marcellin de Marbot (1782–1854), a noted French light cavalry officer during the Napoleonic Wars. Marbot's memoirs depicting the Napoleonic age of warfare had become very popular prior to the publication of Doyle's series about Brigadier Gerard and were praised by Doyle as being the best soldier's book known to him.

The fictional Gerard is not to be confused with the real Napoleonic officer Étienne Maurice Gérard (1777–1852), who rose to become a Marshal and later Prime Minister of France.

Stories
The stories were originally published in the Strand Magazine between December 1894 and September 1903. They were later issued in two volumes: The Exploits of Brigadier Gerard in February 1896 and The Adventures of Gerard in September 1903. Some of the titles were changed on re-publication. The last story, "The Marriage of the Brigadier", was published in September 1910. All the stories were published in The Complete Brigadier Gerard in 1995, which includes the story "A Foreign Office Romance" (1894) – a precursor to the stories, but not actually featuring Gerard.

George McDonald Fraser cited Brigadier Gerard as a major inspiration for his own fictional comedic adventurer Harry Flashman, and wrote the introduction to a 2001 collection of Gerard stories. Although rare, the Brigadier Gerard stories are still in print. Twin Engine Publishing HB, Barnes & Noble Books, Echo Library and New York Review Books are some contemporary publishers.  In May 2008, Penguin Classics published the complete short stories as The Exploits and Adventures of Brigadier Gerard as part of their Read Red series.

The Exploits of Brigadier Gerard

The Adventures of Gerard

 Adventures Of Brigadier Gerard (play) (17 October 1903, 1906)

Other stories

Chronology
 "A Foreign Office Romance" (Unnamed)
 "The Marriage of the Brigadier" 
 Uncle Bernac (Novel, major supporting character)
 "How Brigadier Gerard Lost His Ear"
 "How the Brigadier Came to the Castle of Gloom"
 "How the Brigadier Slew the Brothers of Ajaccio"
 "How the Brigadier Captured Saragossa" ("How the Brigadier Joined the Hussars of Conflans")
 "How the Brigadier Held the King"
 "How the King Held the Brigadier"
 "How the Brigadier Triumphed in England"
 "How the Brigadier Slew the Fox" ("The Crime of the Brigadier")
 "How the Brigadier Took the Field Against the Marshal Millefleurs"
 "How the Brigadier Saved the Army"
 "How the Brigadier Rode to Minsk"
 "How the Brigadier Played for a Kingdom"
 "How the Brigadier Won His Medal" ("The Medal of Brigadier Gerard")
 "How the Brigadier Was Tempted by the Devil"
 "How the Brigadier Bore Himself at Waterloo" ("The Brigadier at Waterloo")
 The Adventures of Brigadier Gerard (Play)
 "The Last Adventure of the Brigadier" ("How Etienne Gerard Said Goodbye to His Master")

Adaptations
In 1915 a silent film Brigadier Gerard was made, directed by Bert Haldane with Lewis Waller in the title role.

The French film Un drame sous Napoléon (1921), directed by Gérard Bourgeois, was a film version of the short novel Uncle Bernac.

A 1927 film with Rod La Rocque as Gerard had the title The Fighting Eagle.

Eight radio plays adapted from the stories aired on BBC radio in 1954. James McKechnie played Gerard.

In 1970 The Adventures of Gerard was directed by Jerzy Skolimowski with Peter McEnery playing Gerard.

Simon Russell Beale read a five-part adaptation on BBC Radio 4 in July 2000.

References
Notes

Bibliography
The Complete Brigadier Gerard, Sir Arthur Conan Doyle, with an Introduction by Owen Dudley Edwards, Canongate Books Ltd., Edinburgh. 1995.

External links

 Michael Chabon about Brigadier Gerard at NPR.
The Exploits of Brigadier Gerard at Project Gutenberg
The Adventures of Gerard at Project Gutenberg
 
 

 

Arthur Conan Doyle characters
Brigadier Gerard
Fictional brigadiers
Fictional French people
Male characters in literature
Cultural depictions of Napoleon
Novels set during the Napoleonic Wars
Novels set in France
Works about the Battle of Waterloo
Short stories adapted into films
Literary characters introduced in 1894
Fictional people from the 18th-century
Fictional people from the 19th-century